Rafael Duarte Lima (born March 9, 1983, in Belém) is a Brazilian boxer best known to win the bronze medal in Heavyweight event at the 2007 Pan American Games.

Career
Lima started to box at the age of 18 and won the National Championships at 201 lbs from 2003 to 2007.

He won silver medal at the 2006 South American Games when he lost the final to José Payares .

In 2007 he lost his semifinal to top favorite Osmay Acosta winning the bronze medal at the Pan American Games in Rio de Janeiro.

External links
South Americans 2006
PanAm Games 2007

1983 births
Heavyweight boxers
Living people
Brazilian male boxers
Boxers at the 2015 Pan American Games
Pan American Games bronze medalists for Brazil
Pan American Games medalists in boxing
South American Games silver medalists for Brazil
South American Games medalists in boxing
Competitors at the 2006 South American Games
Medalists at the 2015 Pan American Games
21st-century Brazilian people